Maryland held its elections October 1, 1810.

See also 
 Maryland's 4th congressional district special election, 1810
 Maryland's 7th congressional district special election, 1810
 Maryland's 6th congressional district special election, 1811
 United States House of Representatives elections, 1810 and 1811
 List of United States representatives from Maryland

Notes 

1810
Maryland
United States House of Representatives